Haberlandia odzalaensis is a moth in the family Cossidae. It is found in the Republic of the Congo and the Central African Republic, but might also be present in south-eastern Cameroon and the north-western Democratic Republic of the Congo. The habitat consists of forests.

The wingspan is about 22 mm for males and 26 mm for females. The forewings are deep colonial buff with several buffy-olive lines from the costa to the dorsum. The hindwings are deep colonial buff with a buffy-olive patch.

Etymology
The species name refers to Odzala-Kokoua National Park, the type locality.

References

Moths described in 2011
Metarbelinae
Taxa named by Ingo Lehmann